João Barbosa, commonly known as Branko, is a Portuguese DJ and producer who first became known as part of the Buraka som Sistema.

Career
His debut album as Branko, Atlas, was released in 2015 — inspired by his travels around Cape Town, New York, Amsterdam and São Paulo — and featured collaborations with Princess Nokia and DJ Sliink and with Rodes Rollins on the track "Out Of Sight (So Right)".

Branko’s  popular track ‘Let Me Go’ featuring Mr. Carmack & Nonku Phiri, gained traction on sites such as i-D, Hypebeast and The Fader.

He has worked with artists like Santigold and Anik Khan, as well as M.I.A., with whom he worked on her 2016 album AIM.

Branko also oversees a monthly radio show on NTS, Enchufada Na Zona, which is broadcast live from the label's headquarters in Lisbon, and formed the inspiration for a compilation of the same name.

He performed as one of the interval acts, along with Sara Tavares, Mayra de Andrade e Dino D'Santiago, during the final of the Eurovision Song Contest 2018, which was held in Lisbon.

Branko's second solo album 'Nosso' was announced on 22 Jan 2019 by Rolling Stone Magazine. It features collaborations with Sango, Cosima, Mallu Magalhães, Dino d'Santiago, Catalina García of Monsieur Periné, Pierre Kwenders, Miles From Kinshasa, Umi Copper, PEDRO and Dengue Dengue Dengue.

See also
Buraka som Sistema
AIM (album)
Enchufada

References

External links
Twitter
Resident Advisor

Portuguese DJs
Musicians from Lisbon
Living people
Year of birth missing (living people)